Baye Djiby Fall (born 20 April 1985), often referred to simply as Djiby, is a Senegalese professional football coach and a former forward. He is the manager of Génération Foot. Fall last played for Hobro IK in the 2018–19 Danish Superliga. Fall has previously played professional for top-flight clubs in Denmark, United Arab Emirates, Russia, Norway and Belgium. In Norway he was the top goalscorer in Tippeligaen with his 16 goals for Molde FK.

Career

Born in Thiès, Senegal, Fall moved to France at the age of 18, where he joined Auxerre's academy. After spells at the French club AS Vitré, Danish club Randers FC and Emirati club Al Ain FC he joined Odense Boldklub in January 2008 where he was named the best player in the Danish Superliga. After 18 goals in 33 matches for OB the Senegalese top striker moved to Russian club Lokomotiv Moscow.

After playing 11 matches for Lokomotiv Moscow without scoring any goals, he was loaned out to Norwegian club Molde on 25 January 2010. Molde's head coach Kjell Jonevret said that even though Fall was bigger and stronger, and a different kind of player then Mame Biram Diouf, he was considered a replacement for the player who was transferred to Manchester United. Fall's loan-deal lasted until 30 August 2010, with an option to buy. In July 2010, Molde extended the loan-deal to the end of the 2010-season and Fall went on to become top scorer of Tippeligaen (the Norwegian top division) for the 2010 season, despite a lower half finish for Molde. Fall became the first Molde-player since Jan Fuglset in 1976 with this achievement. Fall was later loaned out to his old club OB, and in the 2011–12 UEFA Europa League, he scored with his final move in the 93rd minute to dump Fulham out of the competition following a 2–2 draw.

In January 2012, Fall joined the Belgium club Lokeren. In August 2012, he was signed as a replacement for Olivier Occéan in the German club Greuther Fürth, who had been promoted to the Bundesliga for the first time. Germany became the eighth country Fall had been playing football in the last eight years. Fall played two matches without scoring a goal during his first season in Germany, and after the season Greuther Fürth was trying to sell Fall to another club. He returned to his old club Randers on the last day of the transfer window.

Irtysh Pavlodar
In February 2016, Fall went on trial with Kazakhstan Premier League side FC Irtysh Pavlodar, signing for them on 3 March 2016.

After initially announcing the release of Fall on 1 July 2016, FC Irtysh Pavlodar announced on 6 July 2016 that due to a ban imposed on them registering new players Fall would continue playing for the club.

Fall signed for Hobro IK in Denmark in the summer 2018. He left the club again at the end of his contract, which was on 1 January 2019 after playing 6 games for the club.

FC Cincinnati

On 13 February 2017, Fall signed for United Soccer League side FC Cincinnati. He scored four goals in FC Cincinnati's home opener on 15 April 2017. On 22 April 2017, Fall was shown a red card towards the end of a match against Louisville City FC at Nippert Stadium in Cincinnati. In an exchange that took place as he was exiting the pitch, Fall allegedly bit Louisville midfielder Niall McCabe on the cheek. This resulted in a six-game ban and an undisclosed fine handed down by the USL. Fall was released by Cincinnati at the end of their 2017 season.

Career statistics

Club

International

Honours
Lokeren
 Belgian Cup: 2011–12

Individual
 Tippeligaen top scorer: 2010
 Molde top scorer: 19 goals in 2010

References

External links

 Official Danish career statistics 
 

1985 births
Living people
Sportspeople from Thiès
Association football forwards
Senegalese footballers
Senegal international footballers
AS Vitré players
Randers FC players
Al Ain FC players
Odense Boldklub players
FC Lokomotiv Moscow players
Molde FK players
K.S.C. Lokeren Oost-Vlaanderen players
SpVgg Greuther Fürth players
Karşıyaka S.K. footballers
FC Irtysh Pavlodar players
FC Cincinnati (2016–18) players
Danish Superliga players
Russian Premier League players
Eliteserien players
Belgian Pro League players
Bundesliga players
TFF First League players
Kazakhstan Premier League players
USL Championship players
Senegalese expatriate footballers
Expatriate footballers in France
Senegalese expatriate sportspeople in France
Expatriate men's footballers in Denmark
Senegalese expatriate sportspeople in Denmark
Expatriate footballers in the United Arab Emirates
Senegalese expatriate sportspeople in the United Arab Emirates
Expatriate footballers in Russia
Senegalese expatriate sportspeople in Russia
Expatriate footballers in Norway
Senegalese expatriate sportspeople in Norway
Expatriate footballers in Belgium
Senegalese expatriate sportspeople in Belgium
Expatriate footballers in Germany
Senegalese expatriate sportspeople in Germany
Expatriate footballers in Turkey
Senegalese expatriate sportspeople in Turkey
Expatriate footballers in Kazakhstan
Senegalese expatriate sportspeople in Kazakhstan
Expatriate soccer players in the United States
Senegalese expatriate sportspeople in the United States
UAE Pro League players
Senegalese football managers